Charles Thomas Lefley (born January 20, 1950) is a Canadian former professional ice hockey forward.

Lefley was born in Winnipeg, Manitoba.  Drafted by the Montreal Canadiens sixth overall in the 1970 NHL Amateur Draft, Lefley started his National Hockey League career with Montreal in 1971. He was traded from the Canadiens to the St. Louis Blues for Don Awrey on November 28, 1974. In 1975-76 he set a Blues franchise record by scoring 43 goals, a record later broken by Wayne Babych. Lefley, whose older brother Bryan Lefley spent five seasons in the NHL, left the Blues in 1977-78, joining Jokerit Helsinki for one season scoring 12 goals and 11 assists in 24 games. He returned to the Blues in 1979-80, playing parts of two seasons before retiring after the 1980–81 season.  He won two Stanley Cups with the 1971 and 1973 Montreal Canadiens.

Awards and achievements
MJHL Rookie of Year (1966)
Turnbull Cup MJHL Championship (1966)
Played in the World Championships for Team Canada (1969)
Calder Cup (AHL) Championship (1972)
Stanley Cup Championship (1971, 1973)
"Honoured Member" of the Manitoba Hockey Hall of Fame

Career statistics

Regular season and playoffs

International

References

External links

Profile at hockeydraftcentral.com

1950 births
Living people
Canadian ice hockey centres
Brandon Wheat Kings players
Montreal Canadiens draft picks
Montreal Canadiens players
National Hockey League first-round draft picks
Ice hockey people from Winnipeg
St. Louis Blues players
Stanley Cup champions
Winnipeg Rangers players